Eretmocera jemensis is a moth of the family Scythrididae. It was described by Hans Rebel in 1930. It is found in Yemen.

References

jemensis
Moths described in 1930